Machaeridia may refer to:

Machaeridia (annelid), a class of prehistoric worms
Machaeridia (insect), a genus of insects in the family Acrididae